(born August 8, 1952, in Sakai, Osaka, Japan) is a Japanese singer, dancer and actor known for his roles in the 1969 film Funeral Parade of Roses, directed by Toshio Matsumoto, and the 1985 film Ran, directed by Akira Kurosawa. Ikehata uses the stage name  when he appears on TV variety shows and musical revues. Always seen dancing in tight clothes at dancing clubs, he adopted the stage name at sixteen years old after his style of dress and dance which was said to resemble Peter Pan. One of Japan's most famous gay entertainers, Peter's androgynous appearance has enabled him to often play transgender characters and he often appears on stage in dresses.

Filmography and discography

Film

Television
 Garo: Makai Senki (2012)

Video games
 Drakengard (2003), Caim, Angel (credited separately as Shinnosuke Ikehata and Peter)
 Drakengard 2 (2005), Caim, Angel (credited as Peter and Shinnosuke Ikehata)
 Nier (2010), Grimoire Weiss (credited as Peter and Shinnosuke Ikehata)
 Yakuza: Dead Souls (2011), DD
 Drakengard 3 (2013), Michael (credited as Peter)

References

External links

 Shinnosuke Ikehata’s voice work I
 

1952 births
Japanese LGBT musicians
Japanese LGBT actors
Living people
Japanese male film actors
Japanese male pop singers
Japanese male stage actors
Japanese male television actors
Male actors from Osaka
Musicians from Osaka
People from Sakai, Osaka
Japanese gay actors
20th-century Japanese male actors
20th-century Japanese male singers
20th-century Japanese singers
21st-century Japanese male actors
21st-century Japanese male singers
21st-century Japanese singers
Japanese male dancers
Japanese male voice actors
Japanese male video game actors
Japanese LGBT singers